Sydnee Michaels (born June 15, 1988) is an American professional golfer currently playing on the LPGA Tour as of 2012. Michaels was a graduate of the 2011 LPGA Futures Tour.

Early life
Michaels was born in Upland, California, and is the youngest of eight children. As a child she trained in figure skating, but when she was eight years old her father told her that she would grow too tall for the sport.

College
Michaels played college golf at the University of California, Los Angeles. She graduated with a bachelor's degree in History/ Sociology.

Professional
Michaels turned professional in 2010, and joined the Futures Tour on January 18, 2011. Michaels won the last two events of the season, one was the Price Chopper Tour Championship. She finished fourth of the Futures Tour official money list in 2011, and was a full member of the 2012 LPGA Tour. Michaels earned $56,232 on the LPGA Futures Tour in 2011. This allowed Michaels to be awarded the Futures Tour Rookie of the Year award.

Professional wins (2)

Futures Tour wins (2)

Team appearances
Amateur
Junior Solheim Cup (representing the United States): 2005 (winners), 2007

References

External links

Profile at the UCLA Sports site
Yahoo! Sports profile
The Golf Channel profile

American female golfers
UCLA Bruins women's golfers
LPGA Tour golfers
Golfers from California
People from Upland, California
Sportspeople from Temecula, California
1988 births
Living people